Rafał Kaczmarczyk  (born 2 June 1972, in Dzierzgoń) is a retired Polish professional footballer. Kaczmarczyk played several seasons in the Polish Ekstraklasa with Stomil Olsztyn and Widzew Łódź.  He also made two appearances for the Poland national football team.

References

External links
 

1972 births
Living people
Sportspeople from Pomeranian Voivodeship
Polish footballers
Poland international footballers
Lechia Gdańsk players
OKS Stomil Olsztyn players
Widzew Łódź players
Górnik Zabrze players
Dyskobolia Grodzisk Wielkopolski players
Górnik Łęczna players
Association football midfielders
People from Sztum County